Spoony may refer to:

 DJ Spoony, British DJ
The Spoonman, Australian radio show
Brian Carlton (born 1962), host of The Spoonman, who used the aliases "Spoonman" and "Spoony"
 Mark Cross (musician), who used the stage name "Spoony"; former drummer of the German band At Vance
 Noah Antwiler, also known as "Spoony", whose review webseries The Spoony Experiment was hosted on That Guy with the Glasses
 Paddlefish, a species of fish also known as "spoonbills" or "spoonies"

See also 

 Spoon (disambiguation)
 Spoonman (disambiguation)